Fu Shengjun (born 28 December 1972) is a Chinese archer. He competed at the 1992 Summer Olympics and the 2000 Summer Olympics.

References

1972 births
Living people
Chinese male archers
Olympic archers of China
Archers at the 1992 Summer Olympics
Archers at the 2000 Summer Olympics
Place of birth missing (living people)
Archers at the 1994 Asian Games
Asian Games competitors for China
20th-century Chinese people